Feel the Misery is the 12th studio album by British doom metal band My Dying Bride. It was released on 18 September 2015 on Peaceville Records.

Background
The album features the return of guitarist Calvin Robertshaw, replacing Hamish Glencross. Hamish departed amicably to focus on his other band, Vallenfyre.  Andrew Craighan, the principal songwriter for the album, observed that he felt "a brand new freedom" during the creative process.  He explained further his sense of creative freedom: "To give some insight into the mentality behind this album, once I started writing, I just thought, I'm going to write music I like. If it fails, I'll take the slings and arrows."

Craighan has stated the album is, contrary to the title, not the most miserable album in the band's discography, suggesting that it was distinguished by "stronger more direct songs, more hints of death doom through fog-cloaked slithering ambience. It's a more colourful record even if they are mostly hints of colour that's actually bleakness." Craighan noted that "the album title is probably being misunderstood" and clarified that

Reception

Feel the Misery received generally positive reviews. Greg Pratt of Exclaim!, Sam Shepherd of musicOMH and Chad Bowar of Loudwire all described the album as a following the band's formula.  Pratt wrote that "All told, there are no big surprises here, which is great: My Dying Bride rule at what they do, and this is a very well executed, classy, and moving doom album. " Shepherd emphasized the album as "deliver[ing] an album that cements their reputation."  Bowar commented that "The band doesn’t stray far from their comfort zone on the album, and that works very well for them."

Reviewers awarded a large amount of praise to the opening track, "And My Father Left Forever," with James Zalucky of Metal Injection calling the track "surprisingly energetic and bouncy" and Thom Jurek of AllMusic remarking that the track "is a showcase for the band's signature dual-guitar sonics and Aaron Stainthorpe's clean vocals.

Track listing

Personnel
Calvin Robertshaw – guitars
Andrew Craighan – guitars
Aaron Stainthorpe – vocals
Lena Abé – bass
Shaun Macgowan – keyboards, violins
Dan Mullins - drums, percussion

Charts

References

2015 albums
My Dying Bride albums
Peaceville Records albums